Alexander Hamilton High School, also known as Hamilton High School or Hamilton, is a public high school in the Castle Heights neighborhood within the Westside of Los Angeles, California, United States. It is in the Los Angeles Unified School District. It was established in 1931.

History
Alexander Hamilton High School opened in Fall 1931, with Thomas Hughes Elson as the principal. It was designed by architects John C. Austin and Frederick C. Ashley. The three-story administration building held the administration, library, and science departments and 24 classrooms. Other buildings were a manual training building, another for physical training, and a fourth for the cafeteria and "domestic science." The capacity would be 1000, with plans permitting increasing to 2500. Building costs were $125,000 for the land, $400,000 for the structure, and $200,000 for equipment. Built in the Northern Italian Renaissance style, multicolored and patterned brickwork, elaborate cast stone decoration, and a bell tower clad in verdigris copper distinguish the building.

Austin and Ashley later designed Hamilton's $100,000 six-room auditorium, Waidelich Hall which opened on April 20, 1937. The hall was named after Arthur George Waidelich, the second principal at the school. On February 21, 1989, the auditorium was renamed the Norman J. Pattiz Concert Hall. A brass plaque made by the industrial arts department to commemorate the 1937 dedication was removed during renovation.

Early photographs from the school's archives show the campus in its pre-World War II state, with only the main building completed. The photos show dozens of 1920s and 30s cars parked along Robertson Boulevard in front of the school. The bell tower still exists today, but no longer houses a working bell.

Today, there are Brown Hall (which houses administrative offices, the library, and classrooms and is named in honor of Walker Brown, Principal (1940–1956), the lab building, the tech building, the humanities building, the music building, and other structures. There is a large theater hall, named Norman J. Pattiz Concert Hall, a cafeteria, two gym buildings (boys' and girls'), and a workshop building. On the west part of the campus is Los Angeles Department of Water and Power Distribution Station 20 and Cheviot Hills High School, a continuation school. The athletic fields include Al Michaels Field (a football and track stadium named for sportscaster Al Michaels, Hamilton's famous alum) and a community garden, the Hami Garden. The Hami Garden was a joint project funded by the South Robertson Neighborhood Council and the Hami High Environmental Club in 2009. It is maintained by community members and Hamilton High School students.

Alexander Hamilton High School was in the Los Angeles City High School District until 1961, when it merged into LAUSD.

In 1932, its attendance boundaries extended as far north as Mulholland Highway.
In fall 2007, some neighborhoods zoned to Hamilton were rezoned to Venice High School.

Demographics
As of 2019–2020, there were 2,586 students enrolled at Hamilton High School.

Enrollment by race/ethnicity:

 American Indians/Alaska Natives: 8
 Asian: 128
 Native Hawaiian/Pacific Islander: 5
 African American: 671
 Hispanic: 1,334
 White: 398
 Multiracial: 42

Enrollment by gender:

 Male: 1,196
 Female: 1,390

Extracurricular activities

Academy of Music and Performing Arts
Composer Marion Vree taught music and directed the chorus at Hamilton during the 1950s.

The Music Academy gained national attention in June 2002 when the Disney Channel premiered the reality TV show Totally in Tune, which chronicled members of the Academy's Symphony Orchestra.

The Music Academy is a Grammy-recognized school.

Notable people

Alumni

Film and television 
 Lizzy Caplan, actress
 David Cassidy, actor and musician (attended, didn't graduate)
Jackie Cruz, actress
Kaitlin Doubleday, actress
Brian Austin Green, actor
Rita Hayworth, actress
Emile Hirsch, actor
Shia LaBeouf, actor
Alex D. Linz, actor
Tommy "Tiny" Lister, actor
Darris Love, actor
William Margold, adult film actor and director
Bill Mumy, actor
Marc Norman, screenwriter
Randall Park, actor, comedian, and writer
Paula Patton, actress
Michelle Phillips, actress, singer
Kyla Pratt, actress
Michael Preece, film and television director, script supervisor, producer, and actor
Roger Pulvers, playwright, theatre director and translator in Japan and Australia
Nikki Reed, actress
Robert Ri'chard, actor
Joni Robbins, voice-over actress
Steven Robman, director and producer
Will Rothhaar, actor
Carl Tart, actor 
Gwen Verdon, film and Broadway actress

Law 
Evan Freed, attorney, photographer of Robert F. Kennedy presidential campaign, 1968
William Ginsburg, attorney who represented Monica Lewinsky during investigations into her relationship with President Clinton
Robert Shapiro, one of the defense lawyers in the O. J. Simpson murder case

Literature 
Albert Boime, author and academic historian
Sikivu Hutchinson, author and feminist educator
Adam Kirsch, author, journalist, and critic
Olympia LePoint, author and rocket scientist
Walter Mosley, author
Joel Siegel, author and critic on ABC television

Music 
 Wil-Dog Abers, singer for Ozomatli
 Fiona Apple, singer-songwriter (sophomore year only)
 Kevin Bivona, musician and audio engineer
 Warryn Campbell, music producer
 Reeve Carney, singer-songwriter and actor
 Billy Childs, pianist and composer
 Julian Coryell, guitarist, singer-songwriter, and producer
 Eligh, rapper, producer
Mike Elizondo, bassist and producer
Joel Grey, singer and actor
Jordan Hill, singer
Julia Holter, singer-songwriter
Anna Homler, visual, performance and vocal artist
Robert Hurwitz, former president of Nonesuch Records
Nipsey Hussle, rapper
Silvia Kohan, singer-songwriter
Abe Laboriel, Jr., drummer
Howard Leese, guitarist
Jeff Long, bassist
Mann, rapper
Murs, rapper
Omarion, singer
Mimi Page, recording artist, songwriter, producer, and composer
Ariel Rechtshaid, music producer, composer, and musician
Daniel Rossen, guitarist
Scarub, rapper, producer
Jon Schwartz, drummer
Stu Segall, producer and director
Shade Sheist, recording artist, songwriter, producer, actor
Stew, composer
Houston Summers, singer
Syd, singer
Elle Varner, singer
Kamasi Washington, jazz saxophonist

Sports 
 Laila Ali, women's boxing champion
 Stephen Baker, wide receiver for the 1989 Super Bowl champion New York Giants
 Ronald Barak, Olympic gymnast
 Nick Bravin, Olympic fencer
Alex Hannum, basketball player and coach
Alex Hoffman-Ellis, football linebacker
Gary Kirner, football offensive lineman
Peanuts Lowrey, baseball player
Rod Martin, football linebacker
Al Michaels, sportscaster
Warren Moon, football quarterback
Clancy Smyres, baseball player
Leigh Steinberg, sports agent
Sidney Wicks, basketball player
John Wilbur, football player

Politics 
Karen Bass, representative of California's 37th congressional district
Howard Berman, former representative of California's 28th congressional district; chairman of the House Foreign Affairs Committee
Paul Koretz, City of Los Angeles Council member
Lynn Schenk, former representative of California's 49th congressional district

Other 
Greg Johnson, creator of the ToeJam & Earl and Starflight games
Larry Josephson, radio producer and host at WBAI and KPFA
Susan B. Nelson, activist
Norman J. Pattiz, founder of Westwood One
Ben Rich, former director of the Lockheed Skunk Works*
Lilly Samuels Tartikoff, ballet dancer and philanthropist

Faculty
Barry Smolin, singer-songwriter, radio host, and author; taught English
Marion Vree, composer, arranger; taught music

References

External links

Hamilton High home page

Hamilton
Educational institutions established in 1931
1931 establishments in California
Hamilton
Public high schools in California